Norman Paul Kenworthy Jr. (February 14, 1925 – October 15, 2010) was an American film director and cinematographer, mostly for Disney studio films. As co-inventor of the Snorkel Camera System, a remote-controlled periscope camera, he shared a 1978 non-competitive Academy Award for technical achievement with engineer William Latady.

Filmography 
The Living Desert (1953, "photographed by")
The Vanishing Prairie (1954, "photographed by")
Perri (1957, director and "photographed by")
The Best of Walt Disney's True-Life Adventures (1975, co-cinematographer)

References

External links 
 
 The Living Desert, by Kenworthy, in the Library of Congress

1925 births
2010 deaths
American cinematographers
American inventors
Artists from Philadelphia
Cornell University alumni
Academy Award for Technical Achievement winners
Recipients of the John A. Bonner Medal of Commendation
Disney Legends